Selvi is a name, used as both a surname and given name. It may refer to:

Given name 
Selvi Ramajayam, Indian politician

Places
 Selvi, Biga

Surname 
Jayalalithaa (1948–2016), Indian actress and politician, often credited as Kalai Selvi
Murat Selvi (born 1982), Belgian footballer
Thanjai Selvi, Tamil singer
V. Radhika Selvi (born 1976), Indian politician

Films 
 Driving with Selvi, a 2015 documentary film
 Selvi (film), a 1985 Tamil film directed by K. Natraj
 Selvi, a Tamil language version of the 2016 Telugu film Babu Bangaram